Libertad was a Spanish newspaper published in Valladolid between 1931 and 1979. Originally founded by the fascist leader Onésimo Redondo as a weekly of fascist, pro-Nazi and anti-Semitic ideology, during the Civil War it became a daily newspaper. It continued to be published until its disappearance in 1979, after the end of the Franco regime.

History

Early years 
The newspaper was originally founded by the fascist leader Onésimo Redondo as the weekly Libertad, on 13 June 1931. A group of authors who used to publish there, such as Javier Martínez de Bedoya, Carlos Fernández-Cuenca, Jesús Ercilla and Emilio Gutiérrez Palma, gathered around Redondo.

During the republican period it was the main fascist publication in Valladolid, which caused it a few problems with the authorities: suspensions, fines and legal proceedings. In one of these suspensions, the publication had to be temporarily replaced – between 1932 and 1933 – by the weekly Igualdad, before circulating again. From Libertad, a strong follow-up of German Nazism was made, reaching the point of reproducing the writings of Adolf Hitler. Anti-Semitic diatribes appeared in its pages and the anti-Semitic libel Protocols of the Elders of Zion was even published in instalments. During these years it also served as the organ of the party founded by Redondo, the Juntas Castellanas de Actuación Hispánica (JCAH), and later it would also be the organ of its successor, the Juntas de Ofensiva Nacional-Sindicalista (JONS). After the union of the JONS with the Spanish Falange, the magazine continued to be published with some interruptions until 20 May 1935, when it ceased to be published on the orders of the Falangist leader José Antonio Primo de Rivera – who with this measure would have sought to promote the dissemination of the weekly Arriba of Madrid.

Francoist Spain 
After the start of the Civil War in the summer of 1936, Libertad re-emerged as a weekly. Under the new direction of Gabriel Arias-Salgado, as of 21 August 1938, the old weekly began to be published daily. Subsequently, the newspaper became the property of FET and the JONS, and during the Franco dictatorship it became part of the so-called Movement Press as its official organ in Valladolid.

During the years of Francoism, Narciso García Sánchez, Víctor Gómez Ayllón, Timoteo Esteban Vega, passed by the direction of the newspaper. In this period it was one of the three newspapers that were published in the capital of Valladolid, along with Diario Regional and El Norte de Castilla. However, unlike the others, Libertad never had very high sales among the population. In 1966, the newspaper was deficient for the public coffers. After Franco's death, it was incorporated into the state entity Media de Comunicación Social del Estado (MCSE), but the situation continued to worsen. By 1979, it had accumulated losses of almost forty-six million pesetas, and its daily print run was only 885 copies. This situation made its maintenance unsustainable and its closure was finally agreed in 1979.

References

Bibliography 
 
 
 
 
 
 
 
 
 
 
 
 
 
 
 
 
 
 
 

1931 establishments in Spain
1979 disestablishments in Spain
Publications established in 1931
Publications disestablished in 1979
Defunct newspapers published in Spain
Spanish-language newspapers
Francoist Spain
Fascist newspapers and magazines
Antisemitism in Spain